Stuntdawgs is a Canadian documentary mini-series co-created and hosted by veteran stunt double Peter H. Kent. The miniseries premiered on January 13, 2006 on The Movie Network. Kent was a stunt double for Arnold Schwarzenegger in 14 movies.

A 13 half-hour mini-series, Peter H. Kent takes the viewer on a behind-the-scenes look at stunt work in Hollywood films and television series, by re-creating and explaining various stunts, including a motorcycle plunge from Terminator 2: Judgment Day.

Cast 

 Peter H. Kent
 Jeff Sanca
 Rikki Gagne	
 Lars Grant
 Jimmy Broyden	
 Peter Boulanger	
 Kory Grimolfson	
 David Campbell	
 Ninon Parent	
 Rob Wilton	
 Leah Wagner	
 Christopher Gordon	
 Kirk Caouette	
 Brett Armstrong
 Curt Bonn

Awards and nominations
 2006 Gemini Award winner for Best General/Human Interest Series
 2006 Leo Awards nomination for Best Documentary Program or Series - Nature/Environment/Adventure/Science/Technology (David Gullason, Gabriela Schonbach)

References

External links 
 Stuntdawgs website
 

2000s Canadian documentary television series
2000s Canadian television miniseries
Crave original programming
Television series by Entertainment One